The Springfield metropolitan area, also known as Greater Springfield, is a region that is socio-economically and culturally tied to the City of Springfield, Massachusetts. The U.S. Office of Management and Budget defines the Springfield, MA Metropolitan Statistical Area (MSA) as consisting of three counties in Western Massachusetts. As of April 1, 2020, the metropolitan area's population was estimated at 699,162, making it the 84th largest metropolitan area in the United States. Following the 2010 Census, there have been discussions about combining the metropolitan areas of Springfield, Massachusetts and Hartford, Connecticut, into a greater Hartford–Springfield area, due to the region's economic interdependence and close geographic proximity (23.9 miles separate the cities' downtowns). Historically the Census has also identified the region as "Springfield–Holyoke, Mass.–Conn." as those cities were the area's population centers as recently as 1980; since that time the population has become further distributed, including new growth in Amherst, Westfield, and West Springfield, as well as Northern Connecticut. Greater Springfield is one of two combined statistical areas in Massachusetts, the other being Greater Boston.

An alternative system of measuring New England metropolitan areas was developed—called the New England city and town area (NECTA)—because, in New England, towns are a much more important level of government than counties. County government in New England is weak at best, and in Connecticut, Rhode Island, and most of Massachusetts, does not exist at all. In addition, major cities and surrounding towns are often much smaller in land area than in other parts of the United States.  For example, the City of Springfield is 33.2 sq. miles, whereas the City of Fort Worth, Texas, is 298.9 sq. miles, nearly 10 times larger in land area than Springfield. Because of the huge discrepancy in land area, in general New England cities like Springfield feature much higher population densities.  In addition, New England cities and towns have developed allegiances that transcend state borders; thus, cities in Connecticut are included in Springfield's NECTA. This system is thought to better approximate New England's metropolitan areas because it uses New England's geographically smaller building blocks. In Springfield's case, its NECTA consists of 51 additional cities and towns surrounding the city.

Component counties of the MSA

Hampden
Hampshire
Franklin

Component cities/towns of the NECTA

 Amherst
 Ashfield
 Agawam
 Belchertown
 Blandford
 Chester
 Chesterfield
 Chicopee
 Conway
 Cummington
 Deerfield
 East Longmeadow
 East Windsor, Connecticut
 Easthampton
 Enfield, Connecticut
 Goshen
 Granby
 Granville
 Hadley
 Hampden
 Hatfield
 Holyoke
 Huntington 
 Leverett
 Longmeadow
 Ludlow
 Monson
 Montgomery
 Northampton
 Palmer
 Pelham
 Russell
 Shutesbury
 Somers, Connecticut
 South Hadley
 Southampton
 Southwick
 Springfield (principal city)
 Suffield, Connecticut
 Sunderland
 Tolland
 Wales
 Ware
 Wendell
 West Springfield
 Westfield
 Westhampton
 Whately
 Wilbraham
 Williamsburg
 Windsor Locks, Connecticut
 Worthington

Demographics
As of the census of 2010, there were 692,942 people, 269,091 households, and 168,758 families residing within the MSA. The racial makeup of the MSA was 81.10% White, 6.7% African American, 0.30% Native American, 2.5% Asian, 0.04% Pacific Islander, 6.6% from other races, and 2.7% from two or more races. Hispanic or Latino of any race were 15.4% of the population.

As of the census of 2000, there were 680,014 people, 260,745 households, and 167,924 families residing within the MSA. The racial makeup of the MSA was 83.50% White, 5.96% African American, 0.25% Native American, 1.74% Asian, 0.06% Pacific Islander, 6.35% from other races, and 2.13% from two or more races. Hispanic or Latino of any race were 11.15% of the population. In the 2010 census, the metropolitan area had the highest percentage of Puerto Ricans of any metropolitan statistical area in the continental United States.

The median income for a household in the MSA was $42,195, and the median income for a family was $52,551. Males had a median income of $37,784 versus $28,404 for females. The per capita income for the MSA was $20,633.

The median age for the MSA was 38.9 in 2010 overall, with a median age of 37.4 for males and 40.1 for females. The estimated median age in 2017 was 38.2 overall with a median age 36.6 for males and 39.6 for females. Among the 100 most populous MSAs in the United States, the Springfield metropolitan area had the 10th highest life expectancy in 2016 for the top quartile of income earners, adjusted for race and ethnicity, with an overall life expectancy of 87.2.

Transportation

The Pioneer Valley Transit Authority (PVTA) is the primary operator of public transportation services in the Springfield Metropolitan Area. Headquartered in Springfield, the PVTA maintains a fleet of approximately 174 buses, 144 vans, and "is the largest regional transit authority in Massachusetts." Founded in 1974 with the enactment of Massachusetts General Law Chapter 161B, the PVTA serves 24 member communities in Hampden, Hampshire, and Franklin counties. Each member community pays an assessment fee to the PVTA based "on the number of miles served in that city or town." Alternative sources of revenue mostly originate from federal and state governments. The PVTA itself is governed by an advisory board.

Media
The Springfield metropolitan area is tabulated by Nielsen as the Springfield-Holyoke designated market area, and is the 111th largest television market in the United States, with viewership comparable to Tallahassee and Fort Wayne. The area's local news is characterized by 2 operations, the local NBC affiliate WWLP 22, and the consolidated WesternMassNews, representing CBS affiliate WSHM 3, joint ABC affiliate and FOX affiliate WGGB. In 2019 local NPR affiliate WFCR and PBS WGBY merged operations to form New England Public Media.

See also
Massachusetts census statistical areas

References

 
Populated places in Hampden County, Massachusetts
Populated places in Hampshire County, Massachusetts
Populated places in Franklin County, Massachusetts
Geography of Springfield, Massachusetts
Metropolitan areas of Massachusetts
Northeast megalopolis